Eugène Dhers (born 1891) was a French racing cyclist. He rode 11 Tours of France during his career, achieving his best result in 1923, where he placed 9th.

Major results
Source:
1910
 7th Paris–Tours
1911
 3rd Milano-Modena
 5th Paris–Brussels
 10th Paris–Roubaix
1921
 2nd Criterium des Aiglons
1922
 8th Paris–Brussels
1923
 9th Overall Tour de France
1924
 7th Paris–Roubaix

Grand Tour general classification results timeline

References

External links
 

1891 births
1980 deaths
French male cyclists